The Ontario Mathematics Olympiad (OMO) is an annual mathematics competition  for Grade 7s and 8s across Ontario, hosted by the Ontario Association for Mathematics Education (OAME).

Format

Each school can send one team to the OMO, which qualifies by placing in the top two in a regional competition. Each team consists of one Grade 7 boy, one Grade 7 girl, one Grade 8 girl, and one Grade 8 boy. The competition has four stages; individual, pairs, team, and relay. The individual stage is completed by writing a test. The two pairs in the pairs stage are the Grade 7 boy and the Grade 8 girl, and the Grade 8 boy and the Grade 7 girl. Each pair has a set amount of questions to solve. The team stage is completed similarly, with a series of questions. The relay stage is when each member of the team receives a question to answer, but the solution for that question depends on the solution of a previous teammate's question. Thus, if any member of the team does their question wrong, the solutions afterwards are wrong as well.

Awards

There are awards for the top three teams in each of the pairs, team, and relay stages of the competition. For the individual stage, the top three Grade 7 boys, Grade 7 girls, Grade 8 girls, and Grade 8 boys are awarded. There is also a grand prize for the overall winning team.

Past competitions

A table of previous competitions:

References

Educational organizations based in Ontario
Mathematics competitions